= Alexander Rocciasana =

Italian songwriter

- Born: Alessandro Ronconi; 11 November 1989 (age 36)
- Origin: Carrara, Tuscany, Italy
- Genres: experimental, pop rock, pop, punk
- Occupations: Musician, songwriter, producer
- Instruments: Vocals, piano, guitar
- Years active: 2005–present
- Labels: A.R. & Ronconi Software Labels
- Website: alexanderrocciasana.it

Alexander Rocciasana (born November 11, 1989, as Alessandro Ronconi) is an Italian songwriter.

His most popular songs include "La Chanson de la Primière Route", "Adolescenza", "Consumazione Obbligatoria", "Parla", "Disco" and "Campioni del Mondo".

In October 2012, the EP "A Volte Ritornano..."—containing the 2012 version of "Disco"—was reviewed by Vice.com, and it received positive feedback.

== Partial discography ==
=== Album ===
- 2009 – Non Voglio Restare Solo (EP)
- 2010 – The Womens (EP)
- 2012 – A Volte Ritornano... (EP)
- 2016 – Poesie e Canzoni (Album)
- 2017 – Volume 2 (La Svolta) (EP)

=== Singles ===
- 2013 – Consumazione Obbligatoria
